Chad Christensen is an American politician, former law enforcement officer, and U.S. Army veteran, who is a member of the Idaho House of Representatives for the 32nd district, Seat B. He is a Republican.

Early life and education 
Christensen was born in Idaho Falls, Idaho, in 1973. He graduated from Ricks College in Rexburg, Idaho, with an associate degree in criminal justice. He also graduated from Idaho State University in Pocatello, Idaho, with a Bachelor of Arts degree in political science.

Career 
Christensen was in the US Army for 12 years, and also worked in law enforcement.

Christensen was listed as a member of the Oath Keepers.

In 2019, Christensen waged a public campaign against Boise State University, stating his intention to defund them over their alleged use of gender neutral bathrooms and offering of free feminine hygiene products.

During the 2020-2021 COVID-19 pandemic, Christensen was an outspoken critic of vaccines and social distancing public orders. In October 2020, he appeared in a video produced by the Idaho Freedom Foundation. He, Lieutenant Governor Janice McGeachin, and other state legislators criticized Governor Brad Little for the state's COVID-19 restrictions.

Christensen lost his bid for re-election to Ammon City councilman Josh Wheeler in the 2022 primaries.

References

External links
 Idaho Legislature biography
 Vote Smart biography

Living people
Republican Party members of the Idaho House of Representatives
Year of birth missing (living people)
American Mormon missionaries in the United States
Idaho State University alumni
Brigham Young University–Idaho alumni
Latter Day Saints from Idaho
People from Idaho Falls, Idaho
Military personnel from Idaho